The Candy Girl is a 1917 American silent drama film directed by Eugene Moore and starring Gladys Hulette, William Parke Jr., and J.H. Gilmour.

Plot
Nell (Gladys Hulette) leaves the farm to start a candy store in New York, but has a troubled start until she meets Jack Monroe (William Park Jr.), a young spend thrift who helps her attract business. They fall in love, marry, and move in with Jack's father (J. H. Gilmour). Nell soon discovers that Jack is a drug addict. In sympathy, Jack's father offers to annul the marriage, but Nell refuses, wishing instead to commit herself to the indefinite struggle of pursuing the road to Jack's rehabilitation.

Cast

Reception
The film was well-received and Hulette's performance as Nell was especially praised. Exhibitor's Trade Review wrote, "The Candy Girl offers a typical vehicle for this particular star and a story that is brimming over with human interest. Its success lies in the quaint pathetic appeal intermingled with a tinge of humor that increases the holding power upon an audience."

The Moving Picture World wrote that, "The characters are well drawn, especially that of the candy girl herself. Miss Hulette does not merely play the part - she lives it. The Candy Girl seems destined to rank with the best of her previous successes."

References

Bibliography
 Langman, Larry. American Film Cycles: The Silent Era. Greenwood Publishing, 1998.

External links
 

1917 films
1917 drama films
1910s English-language films
American silent feature films
Silent American drama films
American black-and-white films
Films directed by Eugene Moore
Pathé Exchange films
1910s American films